Larry Eigner (August 7, 1927 – February 3, 1996), also known as Laurence Joel Eigner, was an American poet of the second half of the twentieth century and one of the principal figures of the Black Mountain School.

Eigner is associated with the Black Mountain poets and was influential among Language poets. Highlighting Eigner's influence on the "Language School" of poetry, his work often appeared in the journal L=A=N=G=U=A=G=E, and was featured on the front page of its inaugural issue in February 1978.

Ron Silliman dedicated the 1986 anthology of Language poetry, In the American Tree, to Eigner. In the introduction to In the American Tree, Silliman identifies Eigner as a poet who has "transcended the problematic constraints" of Olson's speech-based projectivist poetics. Eigner has himself pointed out that his poetry originates in 'thinking' rather than speech.

During his lifetime, Eigner wrote dozens of books and published poems in more than 100 magazines and collections. Charles Bukowski once called him the "greatest living poet."

Life and work

Eigner was critically palsied as a result of a bungled forceps delivery at birth.  He grew up in Swampscott, Massachusetts. Despite his impairments, Eigner's mother, Bessie, was an advocate for his education. Eigner began writing poetry around the age of 8, which he transcribed to his mother and brother, Richard. He attended middle school at Massachusetts Hospital School and completed high school and some college (at the University of Chicago) through correspondence. His first works were published at age 9. As he matured into an artist, Eigner overcame many physical obstacles and limitations to achieve a mastery over the material text, producing his typescripts on a 1940 Royal manual typewriter using only his right index finger and thumb.<ref>Eigner was able to "create shifting constellations of words in space whose musical and visual designs are realized in a language at once immediate and highly abstract, according to his publisher's page at Stanford University Press's Eigner page</ref>

Perhaps the best realization to date of the idea of "composition by field" proposed by Charles Olson in his landmark essay "Projective Verse," the physical act of writing took tremendous effort from Eigner.

Larry Eigner authored more than 40 books, among them From the Sustaining Air (1953), Another Time in Fragments (1967), Country/Harbor/Quiet/Act/Around-selected prose(1978), and Waters/Places/a Time (1983). His work appeared in well over a hundred magazines and collections, most notably Origin, The Black Mountain Review, L=A=N=G=U=A=G=E, and in Don Allen's anthology The New American Poetry. In 2010, Stanford University Press published The Collected Poems of Larry Eigner, Volumes 1–4 (Vol. I: 1937–1958; Vol. II: 1958–1966; Vol. III: 1966–1978; Vol. IV: 1978–1995). The four volumes were edited by Robert Grenier and Curtis Faville.

Larry Eigner died from pneumonia and other complications on February 3, 1996.

Poet Jennifer Bartlett is currently working on a biography of Eigner.Jennifer Bartlett. "Bartlett on Eigner", Jennifer Bartlett, Poet. November 17, 2015.

Jon David Polansky is currently the acting executor for the literary estate of Larry Eigner.

References

External links

Eigner exhibits, sites and homepages 
 Larry Eigner Author Homepage at EPC
 Larry Eigner Papers housed at Stanford University
 Larry Eigner Papers housed at the Kenneth Spencer Research Library, University of Kansas
 Eigner Author Page at Stanford University Press The publisher of The Collected Poems of Larry Eigner, Volumes 1-4 offers extensive resources on Eigner's life to include reviews, descriptions, and a pdf file of editor Robert Grenier's "Introduction"
 Larry Eigner page at PENNSound include audiofiles of readings and interviews
 of the Larry Eigner Papers hosted by Online Archive of California (OAC)
 Larry Eigner Papers at Brown University Library 
Selected online publications, poems and poetry 
 Air the Trees Originally published by Black Sparrow Press in 1968 and long out of print, the text is presented here on-line and complete
 "how many years / without death": Larry Eigner's memento mori five poems from readiness / enough / depends / on, then a brief essay
 TOTTEL'S #15: Larry Eigner Issue
Reviews and perspectives
 The Same Old Things: The poetry of Larry Eigner essay on Eigner's poetry in Jacket
 Reading Eigner and readiness / enough / depends / on Poet and indefatigable blogger Ron Silliman discusses a recent Eigner (posthumous) publication
Missing Larry: The Poetics of Disability in Larry Eigner This online essay makes up Chapter 5 of poet and scholar Michael Davidson's book Concerto for the Left Hand; Disability and the Defamiliar Body, published by University of Michigan Press in 2008.
 Born from the Head - Larry Eigner's 1st Published Poem in 1952 this essay is by Curtis Faville, who coedited Eigner's Collected ¿¿ Fidelity to Eigner's Poem-Pages ??(no no oh no oh no no no) Here began a controversy surrounding the 2010 publication of Eigners Collected initiated by Steven Fama. Fama argues that the editors and publishers of the Collected have not shown the requisite fidelity to the spacing & visual presentation of Eigner's typescripts. In the comment section after the article, a coeditor of the Collected, Curtis Faville, defends the editorial decisions made to bring a Collected Eigner into print.
 "I have lived with the poetry of Larry Eigner for 45 years Ron Silliman's first response to the publication of Eigner's Collected. Silliman also weighs in on the publication controversy surrounding the layout of the Collected''.
Obituaries 
 Eigner's online tribute/obituary page at SUNY-Buffalo's Electronic Poetry Center

1927 births
1996 deaths
Jewish American poets
Language poets
Black Mountain poets
People from Swampscott, Massachusetts
20th-century American poets
20th-century American male writers
20th-century American Jews